St. Benny the Dip is a 1951 American comedy film directed by Edgar G. Ulmer. The film is also known as Escape If You Can in the United Kingdom.

Plot summary 
Benny (Dick Haymes), Monk (Lionel Stander) and Matthew (Roland Young) are three small-time crooks trying to escape a police dragnet in New York City. After hiding in a church and taking minister's suits and dog collars, they emerge, dressed as priests, and find shelter in an abandoned Bowery mission. When beat cops mistake them for real ministers sent to restore the soup kitchen, they are forced to go along with repairs, holding services and feeding the poor. They have to decide whether to stay, steal the mission money and run, or... change their lives. As with Jean Valjean in Les Misérables, when the bishop he has robbed lets him go, it is the first time they have been treated with respect and had a chance to do good work. The question is whether the police detectives or junior priests will turn them in before they even have a chance.

Cast 
Dick Haymes as Benny
Nina Foch as Linda Kovacs
Roland Young as Matthew
Lionel Stander as Monk Williams
Freddie Bartholomew as Reverend Wilbur
Oskar Karlweis as Mr. Kovacs
 William A. Lee as Police Sergeant Monahan
 Dick Gordon as Reverend Miles
 Jean Casto as Mrs. Mary Williams
 Eddie Wells as Patrolman McAvoy
James Bender as House Detective
 Ron & Don Ansell as the Twins

Soundtrack 
I Believe
Words and Music by Robert W. Stringer

External links 

1951 films
1950s crime comedy films
American black-and-white films
American crime comedy films
Films about con artists
Films directed by Edgar G. Ulmer
Films set in New York City
Films shot in New York City
United Artists films
1951 comedy films
1950s English-language films
1950s American films